Walkersville is an unincorporated community in Lewis County, West Virginia, United States. Walkersville has a post office with ZIP code 26447.

There are several accounts regarding the origin of the name Walkersville.

References

Unincorporated communities in Lewis County, West Virginia
Unincorporated communities in West Virginia